Events from the year 1834 in Russia

Incumbents
 Monarch – Nicholas I

Events

 
 
  
  
 
 
 
 
 Treaty of Saint Petersburg (1834)
 Biblioteka Dlya Chteniya
 Central Moscow Hippodrome
 Fort Stikine
 National Pedagogical Dragomanov University
 Sev Berd
 Taras Shevchenko National University of Kyiv
 Warsaw Citadel

Births

 Maria Golitzyna, noble, courtier and philanthropist (d. 1910)
 Elizabeth Trubetskaya, courtier  (d. 1907)
 Alexandra Albedinskaya, courtier  (d. 1913)

Deaths

References

1834 in Russia
Years of the 19th century in the Russian Empire